Curierul Naţional (The National Courier in Romanian) is a Romanian daily newspaper published in Bucharest. The paper was established in 1991.

References

External links
 Curierul Naţional, official site

1991 establishments in Romania
Newspapers published in Bucharest
Publications established in 1991